Deveni Warama is a 2016 Sri Lankan Sinhala romantic film directed by G. Nandasena and co-produced by G. Nandasena himself with Jagath Epaladeniya and R.A Saranapala. It stars Pubudu Chathuranga and newcomer Rishi Anjela in lead roles along with Tennyson Cooray, Rex Kodippili and Gayathri Dias. Music composed by Harshan Shan. It is the 1281st Sri Lankan film in the Sinhala cinema.

Plot
Kusal Karaliyadda is a young man who doesn't like young girls. He wants to take the hand of a rural girl.

But Kusal does not belong to a rural generation. His father was a prominent minister in the country. The mother also belongs to the bourgeoisie. In spite of that, Samanmalee is the beauty who finds the merits of a rural rubber girl who falls for the simple countryside.

In the face of this arbitrary Kusal's quarrel, Kusal's father's father is adamant in his decision to marry a friend's daughter to Kusal. That proposed ruby also makes a lot of sacrifices to change Kusal's mind.

Amisha, Kusal, Samanmalee love story takes a different dimension as the magical third joins between the two who turn the bilateral love into a love triangle that meets Samanmalith while enjoying the series of films that revolve around different rural and urban environments.

Cast
 Pubudu Chathuranga as Kusal Karaliyadde
 Rishi Anjela as Samanmali / Ameesha
 Tennyson Cooray as John, the chef
 Rex Kodippili as Wickrama Karaliyadde, Kusal's father
 Cletus Mendis as Somaratne
 Gayathri Dias as Receptionist 
 Kumari Munasinghe as Samanmali's mother
 Samudra Hikkaduwa as Surangi Karaliyadde, Kusal's mother
 Premadasa Vithanage as Atapattu, security officer
 Chinthaka Peiris as Priyantha, Kusal's friend

References

2016 films
2010s Sinhala-language films